Lord of the Isle of Man may refer to:
pre-1504, King of Mann
post-1504, Lord of Mann